Darrick E. Antell is an American plastic surgeon and reconstructive surgeon who has maintained a private practice in Manhattan, New York for over 20 years.  Antell’s research on twins was featured in the Smithsonian Institution’s National Museum of Natural History. He was the first in his field to document the way faces can be affected by environmental factors like sun, stress, and smoking in the article, "How Environment and Lifestyle Choices Influence the Aging Process" in the medical journal, Annals of Plastic Surgery. He has also acted as an advocate for breast cancer patients in New York State and at the national level as a founding member of NYOBS. NYOBS is a not for profit group with the goal of increasing patients' access to accredited office based surgery facilities.

Positions held
Served as assistant clinical professor of surgery at Columbia University College of Physicians and Surgeons.
Antell has been a clinical faculty member and guest lecturer at American University of Antigua since 2010.
Antell has been the assistant clinical professor of surgery at the Icahn School of Medicine at Mount Sinai since 2014.

References 

 

American plastic surgeons
Living people
Hobart and William Smith Colleges alumni
Case Western Reserve University alumni
Columbia University faculty
Icahn School of Medicine at Mount Sinai faculty
Year of birth missing (living people)